
Primitivo is a variety of black-skinned wine grape.

Primitivo might also refer to:

People 
Ricardo Primitivo González, Argentine basketball player
Primitivo Lázaro, Spanish pianist
Primitivo Maradiaga, Honduran football player
Primitivo Martínez, Filipino basketball player
Primitivo Mijares, Filipino journalist
Primitivo Ríos Vázquez, Mexican politician
Primitivo Viray, President of Ateneo de Naga University

Film 
L'Amore Primitivo, a 1964 comedy

Music 
Primitivo Soul!, 1963 album by Sonny Stitt
Primitivo, 1965 album by Arsenio Rodríguez
Primitivo, 2007 EP by Lucybell

Other 
Primitivo Nero, wine grape variety

Spanish masculine given names